Camillo Mazzella (10 February 1833 – 26 March 1900) was an Italian Jesuit theologian and cardinal.

Biography
Mazzella was born at Vitulano, near Benevento. He and his siblings were first tutored at home. Three of his brothers entered religious life. His twin brother, Ernesto, later became Archbishop of Bari.

Mazzella entered the ecclesiastical seminary of Benevento when about eleven years of age, completed his classical, philosophical, and theological studies before his twenty-fourth year, and was ordained priest in September 1855, a dispensation as he was under canonical age having been granted by Pope Pius IX.

For two years after his ordination he remained at Vitulano, attending to the duties of canon in the parish church, a position he held from his family. Resigning this office he entered the Society of Jesus, 4 September 1857. After spending a year in the novitiate, he was sent to teach philosophy first, at the Seminary of Andria, in Apulia and then at the College of Cosenza, in Calabria.  

When the Jesuits were expelled from Naples in 1860, he went to teach theology at Fourvières (Lyon, France), and in 1867 at Georgetown University, Washington, D.C. In 1869, he was the founder and one of the first professors at Woodstock theological college, Maryland, where he was Prefect of Studies. In 1875, he served a Visitor to the Jesuit Mission in New Mexico. Mazzella became a naturalized American citizen.

In 1878, he was called to Rome to teach at the Gregorian University, and later became president of the Academy of Saint Thomas. He was very involved with Pope Leo XIII's promotion of Thomistic Philosophy. In June 1886 he was named cardinal-deacon of Sant'Adriano al Foro. Even as a cardinal, Mazzella maintained his identity as a Jesuit, spending his summers at the novitiate in Naples.

On 1897, he was made Cardinal-Bishop of Palestrina. Mazzella served at various times as prefect of a number of Curial Congregations, and as Cardinal-Protector of several religious institutes. Mazzella was conservative and an Ultramontanist and likely contributed to the drafting of Testem benevolentiae nostrae, Pope Leo's 1899 letter to James Cardinal Gibbons cautioning him about the dangers of Americanism. He was likewise opposed to Darwin's theory of evolution.

He died in Rome.

Works
 De gratia Christi (1874)
 De Deo creante (1880)
 De Religione et Ecclesia (1880)

References

 

1833 births
1900 deaths
People from the Province of Benevento
19th-century Italian Jesuits
19th-century Italian cardinals
Cardinals created by Pope Leo XIII
Georgetown University faculty
Cardinal-bishops of Palestrina
19th-century Italian Roman Catholic theologians
Jesuit cardinals